Labiobarbus siamensis is a freshwater fish of the family Cyprinidae native to the rivers of Thailand.

Habitat 
Freshwater

Dispersion 
Chao Phraya River, Mekong River, Mae Klong River, and the southern tributary of Thailand.

Utilization 
Fishery: Trade

References

External links
http://fishbase.org/summary/27192

siamensis
Fish of Thailand
Taxa named by Henri Émile Sauvage
Fish described in 1881